Eucalyptus quinniorum, commonly known as monkey gum, is a species of mallee or a small to medium-sized tree that is endemic to northern New South Wales. It has smooth bark with persistent, stringy bark near the base, linear to narrow lance-shaped adult leaves, flower buds in groups of seven, white flowers and hemispherical to cylindrical fruit.

Description
It has smooth greyish bark with a small amount of rough, stringy bark near the base.

Taxonomy and naming
Eucalyptus quinniorum was first formally described in 1999 by John Hunter and Jeremy James Bruhl in the journal Telopea from material collected east of Barraba in 1998. The specific epithet (quinniorum) honours Chris Quinn and Frances Quinn, staff members of the University of New England.

Distribution and habitat
This eucalypt grows in low woodland and occurs in disjunct populations between Kingstown and Upper Moore Creek (north of Tamworth).

References

quinniorum
Myrtales of Australia
Flora of New South Wales
Trees of Australia
Taxa named by Jeremy James Bruhl
Plants described in 1999